Durak Rahman (also Romanized as Dūrak Raḩmān) is a village in Shalil Rural District, Miankuh District, Ardal County, Chaharmahal and Bakhtiari Province, Iran. At the 2006 census, its population was 112, in 17 families.

References 

Populated places in Ardal County